The Sulaymaniyah Museum (Kurdish: مۆزه‌خانه‌ی سلێمانی; Arabic: متحف السليمانية), or Slemani Museum, is an archeological museum located within heart of Sulaymaniyah in the Kurdistan Region of Iraq. It is the second largest museum in Iraq, after the National Museum of Iraq in Baghdad. It houses artifacts dating from the prehistoric period to the late Islamic and Ottoman periods. Several halls of the museum have undergone renovation work and the museum was closed to the public for refurbishment from October 1, 2018, to October 2019.

History

Opening
The museum was opened officially on July 14, 1961. Initially, it was composed of a small building in the Shorsh District. After several years, the museum acquired a new and large building in the heart of Salim Street in the year 1980 CE. The current building has an area of 6000 square meters and is a one-story building. The artifacts are displayed in one small hall (which was recently renovated by the UNESCO) and two large and long halls which are connected by a square-shaped and open lecture hall. During the Iraq-Iran war (1980-1988 CE), the museum was closed entirely to the public. It was reopened for a very short period in 1990 CE. After the Iraqi invasion of Kuwait in August 1990 CE, the museum was closed once again. It was re-opened officially by Mr. Jalal Talabani on August 20, 2000  CE; Mr. Talabani was the secretary general of the Patriotic Union of Kurdistan at that time.

Post-2003
After the US-led invasion of Iraq and subsequent looting of the National Museum in Baghdad, The Sulaymaniyah Museum helped to recover and return stolen artifacts through the controversial practice of buying looted artifacts.

UNESCO
Since 2011 CE, the museum has been collaborating with the UNESCO to develop and renovate the museum and expand its building.

Paikuli Gallery

The Sulaymaniyah Museum in collaboration with the Sapienza University of Rome opened a new gallery on June 10, 2019. The gallery was sponsored by the Italian Ministry of Foreign Affairs (MAECI) and the Ministry of Cultural Heritage (MiBAC). All of the inscribed stone blocks (including many newly discovered ones after 2006) of the commemorative monument of the Sassanian king Narseh (c., 293 CE) were displayed for the very first time to the public. In addition, many building stone blocks and some Sassanian coins and bullae were also included in this permanent exhibition.

Selmani Museum Kids

On September 5, 2019, the Sulaymaniyah Museum inaugurated a hall dedicated to children and called it "Slemani Museum Kids". The hall has many teaching and demonstrative tools for children. This small museum is the first bespoke museum space for children in Iraq. The Consul General of the UK in Kurdistan, Slemani governor, and director-general of the directorate of archaeology and antiquities in Kurdistan have attended the event, as well as many other high-ranking officials in Kurdistan Region in addition to the public. Slemani Museum Kids was a co-creation of the project Archaeological Practice and Heritage Protection in the Kurdistan Region of Iraq. The project is led by the University of Glasgow (UK) in collaboration with the Slemani Directorate of Antiquities and Inherit (UK) and is funded by the British Council's Cultural Protection Fund, in partnership with the Department for Digital, Culture, Media, and Sport.

Narseh Gallery

The Sulaymaniyah Museum and Directorate of Antiquities in collaboration with the Italian Archaeological Mission in Iraqi Kurdistan (MAIKI) created a new permanent gallery displaying for the very first time four large busts of the Sassanian king Narseh (in high reliefs) and one large bust carved in the round. These once decorated the Paikuli Tower, Southern West Sulaymaniyah, Iraqi Kurdistan, and date back to circa 293 CE. The gallery was officially inaugurated on October 24, 2021.

Prehistory Gallery

The Sulaymaniyah Museum renovated two large halls in order to open a new permanent exhibition displaying hundreds of artifacts dating back to the prehistoric period. The artifacts mainly came from Iraqi Kurdistan and its Paleolithic caves, in addition to several recently excavated ancient sites and mounds. The project was sponsored by the Embassy of the United States of America. The exhibition was supposed to be opened in early March 2020, but because of the coronavirus pandemic, the inauguration date was deferred. It was officially inaugurated on February 2, 2021.

Gallery

References

 http://www.unesco.org/new/en/iraq-office/culture/museum-sector/sulaymaniyah-museum/
 http://www.unesco.org/new/en/iraq-office/about-this-office/single-view/news/sulaymaniyah_museum_opens_its_first_renovated_halls_to_public/#.VLlfLicVlRk
 http://www.iraq-businessnews.com/?s=sulaymaniyah

Museums in Iraq
Sulaymaniyah
1961 establishments in Iraq
Museums established in 1961
Archaeological museums in Iraq